The following highways are numbered 790:

Canada
 New Brunswick Route 790
Saskatchewan Highway 790

United States